Andrew Delmos Thomas (born 1 September 1998) is a Russian professional footballer who plays as a goalkeeper for Seattle Sounders FC in Major League Soccer.

Early life
Thomas was born in Moscow to an American father and a Russian mother, but his family moved to London at a young age; as such, he holds citizenship for Russia, the United States, and the United Kingdom. Thomas attended the Merchant Taylors' School, Northwood.  
 
Alongside football, Thomas was a keen cricketer, who played for the Middlesex County Cricket Club youth team from 10 years old, as well as representing the England cricket team at under-17's level.

Career

Youth
In 2008, Thomas joined the Watford academy aged 9 years old, going on to help their under-18's to the Professional Development League South Championship in 2016, keeping nine consecutive clean sheets. On 21 October 2016, Thomas moved on a short-term emergency loan to Wealdstone, making a single appearance for the National League South club. Thomas opted to leave the club following this season to move to the United States.

College and amateur
In 2017, Thomas moved to the United States to study and play college soccer at Stanford University. He redshirted his freshman season, but went on to make 55 appearances for the Cardinal over three seasons, helping the team become Pac-12 Champions in 2018 and 2020. During his time at Stanford, Thomas also earned accolades including three-time United Soccer Coaches All-Far West Region, three-time All-Pac-12 First Team, Pac-12 All-Academic First Team in 2018, United Soccer Coaches All-America Third Team in 2019, and the NCAA Elite 90 Award in 2019.

During his 2019 season, Thomas also appeared for USL League Two side San Francisco City, making two appearances for the club.

Professional
Due to the COVID-19 pandemic affecting the college soccer season, Thomas wasn't eligible for the 2021 MLS SuperDraft in January 2021. However, on 20 May 2021 it was announced that Thomas, Jacob Montes and Spencer Glass would all be made available to MLS clubs via the waiver process. The following day, Seattle Sounders FC acquired the top spot in the waivers process from Chicago Fire in exchange for $50,000 in General Allocation Money, and subsequently selected Thomas.

In June 2021, Thomas joined Seattle's USL Championship affiliate side Tacoma Defiance on loan, starting for the club during a 2–0 win over LA Galaxy II.

International
Thomas is eligible to represent England, Russia and the United States at the international level. In 2019, he was twice called up to United States under-23 training camp but never appeared for the team.

References

External links 
 
 

1998 births
Living people
American people of Russian descent
American soccer players
Association football goalkeepers
Russian emigrants to the United Kingdom
British emigrants to the United States
National League (English football) players
San Francisco City FC players
Seattle Sounders FC players
Footballers from Greater London
Stanford Cardinal men's soccer players
Tacoma Defiance players
USL Championship players
USL League Two players
Watford F.C. players
Wealdstone F.C. players
MLS Next Pro players